Allan Lockwood (born 28 September 1999) is a Lebanon international rugby league footballer who plays as a  for the Burleigh Bears in the Queensland Cup.

Career
Lockwood made his international debut for Lebanon in their 56-14 defeat by Fiji in the 2019 Pacific Test.

References

External links
Lebanon Cedars profile

Lebanese rugby league players
Lebanon national rugby league team players
Rugby league centres
Living people
1999 births